The cabinet of Armand Călinescu was the government of Romania from 6 March to 21 September 1939. Călinescu was assassinated on 21 September 1939.

Ministers
The ministers of the cabinet were as follows:

President of the Council of Ministers:
Armand Călinescu (6 March - 21 September 1939)
Minister of the Interior:
Armand Călinescu (6 March - 21 September 1939)
Minister of Foreign Affairs: 
Grigore Gafencu (6 March - 21 September 1939)
Minister of Finance:
Mitiță Constantinescu (6 March - 21 September 1939)
Minister of Justice:
Victor Iamandi (6 March - 21 September 1939)
Minister of National Defence:
(interim) Armand Călinescu (6 March - 21 September 1939)
Minister of Air and Marine:
Gen. Paul Teodorescu (6 March - 21 September 1939)
Minister of Materiel:
Victor Slăvescu (6 March - 21 September 1939)
Minister of National Economy:
Ion Bujoiu (6 March - 21 September 1939)
Minister of Agriculture and Property
Nicolae Cornățeanu (6 March - 21 September 1939)
Minister of Public Works and Communications:
Mihail Ghelmegeanu (6 March - 21 September 1939)
Minister of National Education:
Petre Andrei (6 March - 21 September 1939)
Minister of Religious Affairs and the Arts:
Nicolae Zigre (6 March - 21 September 1939)
Minister of Labour:
Mihail Ralea (6 March - 21 September 1939)
Minister of Health and Social Security
Gen. Nicolae Marinescu (6 March - 21 September 1939)
Minister of State for Minorities:
Silviu Dragomir (6 March - 21 September 1939)

References

Cabinets of Romania
Cabinets established in 1939
Cabinets disestablished in 1939
1939 establishments in Romania
1939 disestablishments in Romania